Leptobrachium pullum is a species of frog in the family Megophryidae. It is endemic to Vietnam. Its natural habitats are rivers.

Its taxonomic relationship with Leptobrachium mouhoti, recently described from Cambodia, is unclear.

References

pullum
Amphibians of Vietnam
Endemic fauna of Vietnam
Taxonomy articles created by Polbot
Amphibians described in 1921